Schistostephium is a genus of African plants in the chamomile tribe within the daisy family.

 Species

 formerly included
see Cotula 
 Schistostephium radicale - Cotula radicalis

References

Anthemideae
Flora of Africa
Asteraceae genera